Zabrus rotundicollis is a species of black coloured ground beetle in the Pelor subgenus that can be found in Armenia, Iran and Turkey.

References

Beetles described in 1836
Beetles of Asia
Zabrus